Pulford is a former civil parish, now in the parish of Poulton and Pulford, in Cheshire West and Chester, England. It contains 15 buildings that are recorded in the National Heritage List for England as designated listed buildings. Of these, one is listed at Grade II*, the middle grade, and the others are at Grade II. The parish is within the estate of Eaton Hall, the country seat of the Dukes of Westminster and, apart from the village of Pulford, is rural. The listed buildings are mainly estate buildings and a church, the later buildings being designed by the Chester architect John Douglas, alone or with his partners.

Key

Buildings

References
Citations

Sources

Listed buildings in Cheshire West and Chester
Lists of listed buildings in Cheshire